Blaster's Universe is an animated television series, made by Nelvana and Hong Guang Animation, that ran for one season from September 1999 to January 2000 on CBS and in 2000 on Teletoon. It was based on Knowledge Adventure's Blaster Learning System series of educational software.

Characters 
 Max Blaster (voiced by Jonathan Wilson) – a 12-year-old Earth boy, based on the Blasternaut from the video game series.
 GC (voiced by Maryke Hendrikse) – a 12-year-old alien girl from the planet Omega.
 MEL (voiced by Juan Chioran) – Blaster and GC's robotic dog, his name is an abbreviation of "Mechanically Enhanced Lapdog".

Episodes

References

External links 
 

1990s American animated television series
2000s American animated television series
1990s American comic science fiction television series
2000s American comic science fiction television series
1999 American television series debuts
2000 American television series endings
1990s Canadian animated television series
2000s Canadian animated television series
1990s Canadian comic science fiction television series
2000s Canadian comic science fiction television series
1999 Canadian television series debuts
2000 Canadian television series endings
1990s Chinese television series
2000s Chinese television series
1999 Chinese television series debuts
2000 Chinese television series endings
American children's animated action television series
American children's animated space adventure television series
American children's animated education television series
American children's animated comic science fiction television series
American children's animated science fantasy television series
Animated series based on video games
Animated television series about children
Animated television series about extraterrestrial life
Astronomy education television series
Canadian children's animated action television series
Canadian children's animated space adventure television series
Canadian children's animated education television series
Canadian children's animated comic science fiction television series
Canadian children's animated science fantasy television series
Chinese children's animated action television series
Chinese children's animated science fantasy television series
CBS original programming
English-language television shows
Teletoon original programming
Television series by Nelvana